Abagrotis cupida, the Cupid dart or brown climbing cutworm, is a moth of the family Noctuidae. The species was first described by Augustus Radcliffe Grote in 1865. It is found in southern Canada and in the United States east of the Rocky Mountains (except the Deep South).

The wingspan is 33–35 mm. Adults are on wing in late summer in one generation. In Alberta, the flight period ranges from August to September.

Reported food plants include willow, cultivated apple, grape and peach trees.

References

External links

"Abagrotis cupida (Grote 1864)". Moths of North Dakota. Retrieved November 12, 2020.

cupida
Moths of North America
Moths described in 1865